Răzvan Marcel Ailenei (born 4 February 1992) is a Romanian rugby union football player. He plays as a Number 8 for professional SuperLiga club CSM Baia Mare.

Club career
Before joining CSM Baia Mare, Răzvan Ailenei played for Universitatea Cluj.

International career
Ailenei also plays for Romania's national team, the Oaks, making his international debut at the 2016 World Rugby Nations Cup in a match against the Welwitschias.

References

External links

 
 
 
 

1992 births
Living people
Romanian rugby union players
Romania international rugby union players
București Wolves players
CS Universitatea Cluj-Napoca (rugby union) players
CSM Știința Baia Mare players
Rugby union number eights